Marcos Ramírez Fernández (born 16 December 1997) is a Spanish Grand Prix motorcycle racer, competing for MV Agusta in the 2023 Moto2 World Championship.

Career

Junior career
In 2012 he was a competitor of the Red Bull MotoGP Rookies Cup, and qualified on pole position in his first ever race, the opening round in Jerez, eventually finishing the race in 2nd. He would score two other 2nd places in Assen and Aragon, finishing 6th in the championship with 153 points. In 2013 he would return, and score five 3rd places in Assen, Silverstone, Misano, Aragon and Valencia, finishing 5th overall, with 145 points.

Moto3 Junior Championship
In 2014, Ramírez competed in the Moto3 Junior championship, and performed well. He was a regular point finisher, and scored a podium at Portimao. He was also given his Moto3 debut for a one-off wild card race, in his home country of Spain, for the Moto3 Grand Prix in Jerez, which he finished in 21st place.

For 2015, Ramírez would ride 9 races in Moto3, on a Mahindra for the Motomex Team, but scored only 19 points, and would return to Moto3 Junior for the next season.

The 2016 season was Ramírez's breakout year. He won five races, more than anyone else that season, and finished on the podium another three times, on his way to becoming the runner-up to champion Lorenzo Dalla Porta, by merely nine points.

Moto3 World Championship

Platinum Bay Real Estate (2016–2017)
Ramírez's good performances the year prior earned him a full-ride for the 2017 Moto3 World Championship grid, riding full-time for the Motomex Team in Moto3, by now a KTM team. He had two podiums in Germany, and Valencia, and finished the season 8th in the final standings, with 123 points, 88 points in front of his teammate Darryn Binder.

Bester Capital Dubai (2018)
The 2018 season was much the same for Ramírez, two podiums again, this time in Jerez and Le Mans, and 10th place overall in the standings, with 102 points. His teammate was Jaume Masiá, who finished with 76 points, and won rookie of the year.

Leopard Racing (2019)
Ramírez would switch teams between seasons, riding for Leopard Racing in the 2019 Moto3 World Championship, partnered by Lorenzo Dalla Porta, who beat him to the title of the Junior Moto3 champion just three years prior. The duo would perform incredible, winning six races (two by Ramírez, four by eventual champion Dalla Porta), collecting 15 podiums, winning the team's championship by 210 points over the second placed team, and winning the constructor's championship for Honda. Ramírez won two races in Barcelona and Great Britain, finished second in Germany and Australia, and ended the season third in the standings with 183 points.

Moto2 World Championship

American Racing (2020–2021)

2020 
Following their brilliant performance, both Ramírez and Dalla Porta were promoted to Moto2 for the 2020 Moto2 World Championship. Ramírez would partner Joe Roberts at American Racing team, in what was a mixed season. While Ramírez struggled, collecting just 37 points and finishing just 19th in the standings, his teammate Roberts grabbed a podium in Brno, and ended the season seventh in the standings, with 94 points. Dalla Porta also struggled, getting just 5 points throughout the year, at Italtrans.

2021 
Ramírez's teammate Joe Roberts joined Italtrans to partner Dalla Porta in the 2021 Moto2 World Championship, creating an opening at American racing next to Ramírez. Cameron Beaubier joined, and the pair had a relatively similar season, Beaubier finishing with 50 points, Ramírez with 39, just two points better than his tally last season. Due to his lack of results, Ramírez was not offered a new contract at the end of 2021.

MV Agusta Forward Racing (2022–)
Following his departure from American Racing, Ramírez was offered a contract by MV Agusta Forward Racing, for the 2022 Moto2 World Championship, partnering Simone Corsi at the team.

Career statistics

CEV Moto3 Championship

Races by year
(key) (Races in bold indicate pole position, races in italics indicate fastest lap)

Red Bull MotoGP Rookies Cup

Races by year
(key) (Races in bold indicate pole position, races in italics indicate fastest lap)

FIM CEV Moto3 Junior World Championship

Races by year
(key) (Races in bold indicate pole position, races in italics indicate fastest lap)

Grand Prix motorcycle racing

By season

By class

Races by year
(key) (Races in bold indicate pole position; races in italics indicate fastest lap)

Supersport World Championship

Races by year
(key) (Races in bold indicate pole position; races in italics indicate fastest lap)

FIM CEV Moto2 European Championship

Races by year
(key) (Races in bold indicate pole position, races in italics indicate fastest lap)

References

External links

Living people
1997 births
Spanish motorcycle racers
Moto3 World Championship riders
Supersport World Championship riders
Sportspeople from Cádiz
Moto2 World Championship riders